Roman-Taras Yosypovych Shukhevych (also known by his pseudonym, Tur and Taras Chuprynka; 30 June 1907 – 5 March 1950), was a Ukrainian nationalist and a military leader of the Ukrainian Insurgent Army (UPA).

In 1941 he participated with the Nachtigall Battalion in the pogroms of Lviv against the Jewish population.

Shukhevych was one of the perpetrators of the Galicia-Volhynia massacres of approximately 100,000 Poles. It is uncertain whether and to what extent Shuchevych was responsible for the massacres of Poles in Volhynia, but he certainly condoned them after some time, and also directed the massacres of Poles in Eastern Galicia. Ukrainian diaspora and Ukrainian academics have been accused of "glossing over" his role in this and other war crimes.

Life
Shukhevych was born in the city of Lviv, in the Galicia (some sources claim his place of birth as Krakovets). Both Shukhevych's parents were involved with the Ukrainian national revival in the 19th century. The family lays claim to dozens of active community activists in politics, music, science, and art. Shukhevych received his early education outside of Lviv. He returned to Lviv to study at the Lviv Academic Gymnasium, living with his grandfather, an ethnographer Volodymyr Shukhevych. His political formation was influenced by Yevhen Konovalets, the commander of the Ukrainian Military Organization, who rented a room in Yevhen Konovalets's father's house from 1921 to 1922.

Education
In October 1926, Shukhevych entered the Lviv Politechnic Institute (then Politechnika Lwowska – when the city of Lwów was part of the Second Polish Republic) to study civil engineering. In July 1934 he completed his studies with an engineering degree in road-bridge speciality. At this time he was known for his athletic abilities, for which he won numerous awards. He was also an accomplished musician and with his brother Yuriy completed studies in piano and voice at the Lysenko Music Institute. He sang solo on occasions with his brother in the Lviv opera. During his student years in gymnasium, Shukhevych became an active member of the Ukrainian Scouting organization Plast. He was a member of Lisovi Chorty. He organized Plast groups and founded the "Chornomortsi" (Black Sea Cossacks) kurin in 1927.

From 1928 to 1929, Shukhevych did his military service in the Polish army. As a tertiary student, he was automatically sent for officer training. However, he was deemed unreliable, and instead completed his military service as a private in the artillery in Volhynia.

Ukrainian Military Organization

In 1925 Shukhevych joined the Ukrainian Military Organization (UVO). In 1926 the regional team of UVO ordered Shukhevych to assassinate the Lwów school superintendent, Stanisław Sobiński, accused of "Polonizing" the Ukrainian education system. Roman Shukhevych and Bohdan Pidhainy carried out the assassination on 19 October 1926. In 1928–29 Shukhevych served his military service in the Polish Army as an artillerist.

In February 1929 the Organization of Ukrainian Nationalists (OUN) was founded in Vienna. Shukhevych, under the name "Dzvin" (Bell), became a representative of the Ukrainian Executive.

Shukhevych was a leader of a wave of attacks against Polish property and homes in Galicia in 1930 intended to provoke Polish authorities into retaliation and to radicalise Ukrainian society. The Polish administration retaliated with a process of "pacification" which intensified anti-Polish sentiment and increased Ukrainian nationalism.

Shukhevych planned and also participated in terrorist activities and assassinations (sometimes claimed by Ukrainian nationalists to be acts of protest against anti-Ukrainian policies). These included:
 the co-ordination of a series of expropriations from Polish government offices in order to fund continued insurrection in the struggle for Ukrainian national determination, i.e. bank robberies and assaults on postal offices or wagons.
 the 1 September 1931 assassination of Tadeusz Hołówko, a moderate Polish politician, who advocated cultural autonomy for Ukrainians. His murder caused a shock and was condemned by both societies.
 the assassination on 22 March 1932 of Police Commissioner Czechowski 
 the unsuccessful attempted assassination of the Soviet consul in Lviv as a protest for the Holodomor in Central Ukraine. (Mykola Lemyk mistakenly assassinated the special emissary of the NKVD, Alexiy Mayov, instead.)
 the assassination of the Polish member of parliament and Minister of Internal Affairs Bronisław Pieracki, whom the OUN declared responsible for organizing "pacification" actions. Hryts Matseiko carried out the assassination in Warsaw on 15 June 1934.
 the 30 November 1932 assault on the post office in Gródek Jagielloński with Shukhevych's direct participation, in which a number of civilians were killed.

Shukhevych, with Stepan Bandera, Yaroslav Stetsko, Yaroslav Starukh, and others developed a concept of "permanent revolution". According to their manifesto, the Ukrainian people, exploited by an occupier, could only obtain freedom through continued assault on the enemy. As a result, the OUN took on the task of preparing for an all-Ukrainian revolt. Shukhevych propagated the idea that the revolution was an uncompromising conflict in order to permanently defeat the foe.

Shukhevych took an active part in developing a concept regarding the formation of a Ukrainian army. At that time two diametrically opposed arguments existed. The first proposed forming a Ukrainian army of Ukrainian emigrants; the second advocated recruiting a national army in Western Ukraine organized by Ukrainians.

Imprisonment
After the 15 June 1934 OUN assassination of Polish Internal Affairs Minister Bronisław Pieracki, Shukhevych was arrested on 18 July and was sent to the Bereza Kartuska Prison. In December 1935 he was acquitted and released due to lack of incriminating evidence.

From 19 January 1935, Shukhevych was confined to the Brygitki prison in Lwów. He was incarcerated for his membership in the Regional executive of the OUN. The lawyer in the process was his uncle Stepan Shukhevych. Shukhevych was sentenced to three years in jail; however, because of the 1935 amnesty he was released from jail after spending half a year in the Bereza Kartuska and two years in another prison.

During the Warsaw process against the OUN (18 November 1935 – 13 January 1936), Shukhevych was called as a witness. Shukhevych stood by his right to speak in Ukrainian for which he was fined 200 złoty. After greeting the court with the call "Glory to Ukraine", Shukhevych was once again interned.

During the Lwów process against the OUN (25 May – 27 June 1936), Shukhevych was accused of treason, belonging to anti-government organization of OUN and convicted to three years imprisonment. He was released on amnesty on 27 January 1937.

After being released in 1937, Shukhevych set up an advertising cooperative called "Fama", which became a front for the activities of the OUN. Soon outlets were set up throughout Galicia, Volhynia, and within the rest of Polish territory. The workers of the company were members of the OUN, often recently released political prisoners. The company was very successful and had sections working with the press and film, publishing booklets, printing posters, selling mineral water, and compiling address listings. It also opened its own transportation section.

Carpathian Ukraine
In November 1938, Carpathian Ruthenia gained autonomy within the Czechoslovak state. Shukhevych organized financial aid for the government of the fledgling republic and sent OUN members to set up the Carpathian Sich.
In December 1938, he illegally crossed the border from Poland into Czechoslovakia, traveling to the Ruthenian city of Khust. There, with the aid of local OUN members and German intelligence, he set up the general headquarters for the fight against the Czechoslovak central government.

Moreover, in January 1939 the OUN decided to throw off the autonomous government, which seemed too pro-Czechoslovak to them. The coup d'état attempt occurred on the night of 13–14 March, in relation to the proclamation of Slovak independence, managed by Germany. With help of sympathizers among the police, the insurgents led by Shukhevych obtained the weapons of the gendarmerie, but their assaults on garrisons of the Czechoslovak army failed. Just in the Khust 11 OUN fighters were killed and 51 captured. However, after the creation of the Slovak client State on 14 March and the Nazis' seizure of Czech lands on 15 March, Carpathian Ruthenia was immediately invaded and annexed by Hungary. Shukhevych took an active part in the short-term armed conflict with Hungarian forces and was almost killed in one of the actions. 

After the occupation of Carpathian Ruthenia by Hungary ended, Shukhevych traveled through Romania and Yugoslavia to Austria, where he consulted with OUN commanders and was given new orders and sent to Danzig to carry out subversive activities.

World War II
The Nazis and Soviets signed the Molotov-Ribbentrop pact in August 1939, and in September Germany and the USSR invaded Poland, starting World War II and creating new challenges and opportunities for the Ukrainian nationalist movement. In autumn 1939 Shukhevych moved to Kraków with his family where he acted as the contact for the Ukrainian Nationalist Command directed by Andriy Melnyk. He organized the illegal transportation of documents and materials across the Soviet-German border and collected information about OUN activities in Ukraine.

The leadership of the Ukrainian nationalists could not come to a unified agreement regarding tactics. As a result, on 10 February 1940, the organization in Kraków split into two factions - one led by Stepan Bandera and the other by Andriy Melnyk, known as OUN-B and OUN-M respectively. Shukhevych became a member the Revolutionary Command of the OUN-B headed by Bandera, taking charge of the section dealing with territories claimed by the Ukrainians, which after the Molotov-Ribbentrop pact had been seized by Germany (Pidliashshia, Kholm, Nadsiania and Lemkivshchyna).

A powerful web was formed for the preparation of underground activities in Ukraine. Paramilitary training courses were set up. Military cadres were prepared that were to command a future Ukrainian army. Shukhevych prepared the Second Great Congress of the OUN which took place in April 1941.

Nachtigall Battalion

Prior to Operation Barbarossa in late June 1941, the OUN actively cooperated with Nazi Germany. According to the National Academy of Sciences of Ukraine and other sources, OUN-B leader Stepan Bandera held meetings with the heads of Germany's intelligence, regarding the formation of "Nachtigall" and "Roland" Battalions. On 25 February 1941, the head of the Abwehr, Wilhelm Franz Canaris, sanctioned the creation of the "Ukrainian Legion" under German command. The unit would have had 800 persons. Shukhevych became a commander of the Legion from the OUN-B side. OUN expected that the unit would become the core of the future Ukrainian army. In the spring the OUN received 2.5 million marks for subversive activities against the USSR.

In spring 1941 the legion was reorganized into three units. One of the units became known as Nachtigall Battalion, a second became the Roland Battalion, and a third was immediately dispatched into the Soviet Union to sabotage the Red Army's rear. After intensive training the battalion traveled to Riashiv on 18 June, and entered Lviv on 29 June, where the Act for establishment of the Ukrainian Statehood  was proclaimed. The German administration however did not support this act. The first company  of the unit remained in Lviv for only seven days, while the remainder of the unit joined later during their eastward march towards Zolochiv, Ternopil and Vinnytsia.

It is estimated that in June–July 1941 over 4,000 Jews were murdered in pogroms in Lviv and other cities in Western Ukraine. There is  controversy regarding the participation of the Nachtigall Battalion and Roman Shukhevych in these atrocities, as well as in the Massacre of Lviv professors. There are claims that the soldiers of Nachtigall participated in the killing of Jews. During the march at three villages of the Vinnytsia region, Jews were said to have been shot en masse.

The German refusal to accept the OUN-B's 30 June proclamation of Ukrainian independence in Lviv led to a change of the Nachtigall battalion direction. As a result, Shukhevych together with the battalion were recalled to Germany.

201st Schutzmannschaft Battalion

In Germany in November 1941, the Ukrainian personnel of the legion was reorganized into the 201st Schutzmannschaft Battalion. It numbered 650 persons who were given individual contracts that required the combatants to serve for one additional year.

Shukhevych's titles were that of Hauptmann of the first company and deputy Commander of the Battalion, which was commanded by Yevhen Pobihushchyi.

On 19 March 1942, the battalion arrived in Belarus where it served in the triangle between Mahiliou-Vitsebsk-Lepel. With the expiration of the one-year contract, all the Ukrainian soldiers refused to renew their services. On the beginning of January 1943, the battalion was sent to Lviv and there it was disbanded. Its former members formed the core of the OUN (B) security service. The other part joined the Schutzmannschaft Battalion 57, returned to Belarus and continued to fight with the partisans and civilians. Shukhevych decided to join OUN (B) and quickly gained the leading role in the organization.

Polish-German historian and Holocaust expert  from the University of Hamburg describes the activities of the 201st Schutzmannschaft Battalion in Belarus as "fighting partisans and killing Jews". John Paul Himka, a specialist in Ukrainian history during World War II, notes that although units such as the 201st Battalion were routinely used to fight partisans and kill Jews, no-one has studied the specific activities of the 201st battalion from this perspective and this ought to be a subject for further study. It is alleged that more than 2,000 Soviet partisans were killed by the Battalion during its operation in Belarus.

On 1 December 1942 after the expiration of their contracts, the members of the Battalion refused to promulgate it. As the result, the 201st Battalion personnel was taken into detention and relocated to Lviv. The German command suggested to all those who had been in the Battalion to gather in Lublin to form a new unit, however, none of the Ukrainians signed up, and very few reported to Lublin. Some were arrested and placed in the jail on Lonsky street, while Shukhevych escaped, and went into hiding.

Ukrainian Insurgent Army 

After escaping from German custody in late 1942 Shukhevych once again headed the military section of the OUN. In May he became a member of the leadership of the OUN and in time the head. In August 1943 at the Third Special Congress of the OUN, he was elected head of the Direction of the OUN and Supreme Commander of the Ukrainian Insurgent Army known as UPA.

Under Shukhevych's leadership the evolution of the program for which the OUN fought was further refined. Its core tenets were:
 Opposition to all forms of totalitarian government
 Construction of a democratic state system in Ukraine
 Guaranteed right for self-determination against empire and imperialism.

According to Ukrainian historian and former UPA soldier Lev Shankovsky, immediately upon assuming the position of commander of UPA Shukhevych issued an order banning participation in anti-Jewish activities. No written record of this order, however, has been found.

The Insurgent Army was joined by various people from the Caucasus and Central Asia who had fought in German formations. The rise of non-Ukrainians in the Ukrainian Insurgent Army gave stimulus to the special conference for Captive Nations of Europe and Asia which took place 21–22 November 1943 in Buderazh, not far from Rivne. The agenda included the formation of a unified plan for the attack against occupational forces.

During the period of German occupation Shukhevych spent most of his time fighting in the forests, and from August 1944, following Ukraine's annexation by the Soviet Army, he lived in various villages in Western Ukraine. In order to unite all Ukrainian national forces to fight for Ukrainian independence, Shukhevych organized a meeting between all the Ukrainian political parties. As a result, the Ukrainian Supreme Liberation Council (UHVR) was formed.

Massacres of Poles

In spring 1943, the OUN-B's UPA launched a campaign of murder and expulsion against the Polish population of Volhynia, and in early 1944 against the Poles in Eastern Galicia. This was done as a preemptive strike, in expectation of another Polish-Ukrainian conflict over the disputed territories, which were internationally recognized as part of Poland in 1923.

The Polish government in exile wanted to restore eastern Polish borders beyond the Curzon Line, an aim that was also supported by promises from the Western Allies. The OUN regarded Galicia and Volhynia as ethnic Ukrainian territory that should be included in a future restored Ukrainian republic.

It is estimated that up to 100,000 Poles were killed by the Ukrainian nationalists during the conflict and another 300,000 made refugees as a result of the ethnic cleansing. Conversely, killings of Ukrainians by Poles resulted in between 10,000 and 12,000 deaths in Volhynia, Eastern Galicia and present-day Polish territory. University of Alberta historian Per Rudling has stated that Shukhevych commanded the UPA since the summer of 1943, when tens of thousands of Poles were massacred.

Academic Per Anders Rudling has argued that Ukrainian diaspora (as soon as in the 1950s) and Ukrainian academics have been manufacturing a "glossed over" version of Shukhevych role in the massacre of Poles and other war crimes.

Death

Shukhеvych perished supposedly shooting himself during his arrest by agents of the MGB (Ministry of State Security) in an armed fight with an operational group of the MGB that attacked his hiding place (kryivka) in village Bilohorshcha (today part of the city of Lviv) on 5 March 1950 when he was 42. His residence was surrounded by some 700 soldiers of Internal Troops. In a firefight Major Rovenko perished with Shukhevych. Shukhevych was succeeded as leader of UPA by Vasyl Kuk.

After identification, the body of Shukhevych was cremated and its remnants secretly buried. According to NKVD officers' memoirs, Roman Shukhevych's body was transported out of western part of Ukraine, burned, and the ashes scattered. This was done on the left bank of the Zbruch River. The unburned remains were thrown into the Zbruch, where a commemorative stone cross was erected in 2003.

Family
Soviet authorities applied the rationale of collective guilt and persecuted all the members of the Shukhevych family. Roman's brother Yuri was murdered at Lviv's Bryhidka Prison, just before the German occupation of Lviv as part of «unloading» policy. His mother Yevhenia and his wife, Nataliya Berezynska, were exiled to Siberia. His father, Joseph-Zinovy Vladimirovich Shukhevych (1879—1948)  by that time disabled, was also repressed and exiled. He died soon after arriving at prison.

His son Yuri Shukhevych and daughter Mariyka were placed in an orphanage. In September 1972, Yuri was sentenced to ten years' camp imprisonment and another five years' exile after already having spent 20 years in Soviet camps. During that time he lost his vision.

Legacy

On Shukhevych's birthdays mass remembrance meetings take place in various Ukrainian cities.

On 23 October 2001, the Lviv Historic Museum converted the house in which Shukhevych was killed into a memorial museum. He was portrayed by Ukrainian-Canadian actor Hryhoriy Hladiy in the Ukrainian film Neskorenyi (The Undefeated).

Postage stamps and coins have been minted in his honour of the 100th anniversary of his birth. Posthumously, he was awarded the UPA's highest decorations: the Gold Cross of Combat Merit First Class and the Cross of Merit in gold.

In June 2017, the Kyiv City Council renamed the city's General Vatutin Avenue into Roman Shukhevych Avenue. Nikolai Vatutin was a Soviet military commander during World War II who was killed by Shukhevych's Ukrainian Insurgent Army.

On 5 March 2021, the Ternopil City Council named the largest stadium in the city of Ternopil after Roman Shukhevych as the Roman Shukhevych Ternopil city stadium. On 16 March 2021, the Lviv Oblast Council likewise approved the renaming of their largest stadium after Shukhevych and Stepan Bandera, the former leader of the Organization of Ukrainian Nationalists (OUN).

Hero of Ukraine Award (annulled)
Roman Shukhevych was posthumously conferred the title of Hero of Ukraine by President Viktor Yushchenko on 12 October 2007. On 12 February 2009, an administrative Donetsk region court ruled the Presidential decree awarding the title to be legal after a lawyer had claimed that his rights as a citizen were violated because Shukhevych was never a citizen of Ukraine.

President Viktor Yanukovych stated on 5 March 2010 he would make a decision to repeal the decrees to honor the title as Heroes of Ukraine to Shukhevych and fellow nationalist Stepan Bandera before the next Victory Day (in August 2011 he stated "if we look at our past history and build our future based on this history, which had numerous contradictions, we will rob our future, which is wrong"). Although the Hero of Ukraine decrees do not stipulate the possibility that a decree on awarding this title can be annulled, on 21 April 2010, Donetsk Administrative Court of Appeals declared unlawful former Ukrainian President Viktor Yuschenko's decree of 12 October 2007 to award the Hero of Ukraine title to Roman Shukhevych. The court ruled that the former President had had no right to confer this title to Shukhevych, because Shukhevych had died in 1950 and therefore he had not lived on the territory of independent Ukraine (after 1991). Consequently, Shukhevych was not a Ukrainian citizen, and this title could not be awarded to him. On 12 August 2010 the High Administrative Court of Ukraine dismissed suits to declare four decrees by President Viktor Yanukovych on awarding the Hero of Ukraine title to Soviet soldiers illegal and cancel them. The filer of these suit stated they were based on the same arguments used by Donetsk Administrative Court of Appeals that on 21 April satisfied an appeal that deprived Roman Shukhevych the Hero of Ukraine title, as Shukhevych was not a citizen of Ukraine. The title however was not rescinded, pending an appeal to the Supreme Administrative Court of Ukraine which set aside all previous court decisions on 17 February 2011. The Supreme Administrative Court of Ukraine ruled Shukhevych's Hero of Ukraine title illegal in August 2011. On 1 September 2011 former President Yuschenko filed an appeal at the Supreme Court of Ukraine with a request that it cancel the ruling by the Supreme Administrative Court of Ukraine.

See also 

 Roman Shukhevych statue (Edmonton)
 List of Nazi monuments in Canada

References

External links

 Isayuk, O. Death of Roman Shukhevych: on the film and outside it. Ukrayinska Pravda. 5 March 2015
 
 Viatrovych, V. In search of the Shukhevych's burial. In reality it is still not found. Ukrayinska Pravda. 10 March 2012

1907 births
1950 deaths
Military personnel from Lviv
People from the Kingdom of Galicia and Lodomeria
Lviv Polytechnic alumni
Ukrainian people of World War II
Ukrainian generals
Ukrainian anti-communists
Ukrainian collaborators with Nazi Germany
Ukrainian nationalists
Organization of Ukrainian Nationalists
Scouting and Guiding in Ukraine
Commanders of the Ukrainian Insurgent Army
Recipients who were revoked of the title of Hero of Ukraine
Suicides by firearm in the Soviet Union
Carpatho-Ukraine
Inmates of Bereza Kartuska Prison
Ukrainian Auxiliary Police
Roman
Holocaust perpetrators in Poland
Massacres of Poles in Volhynia
War crimes committed by the Ukrainian Insurgent Army
Massacres of Poles in Eastern Galicia